The IX Air Defense Command was a United States Army Air Forces formation.  It was assigned throughout its time in combat to Ninth Air Force. Its final station was at Bad Neustadt an der Saale, Germany, where it was inactivated on 25 June 1946.

History
It was established in England on 19 July 1944, and activated on 1 July 1944.  Mission was to provide air defense for liberated areas of Western Europe consisting of France and later, the Low Countries.  Subordinate wing headquarters and subordinate units operated primarily from liberated airfields and newly built temporary Advanced Landing Grounds in continental Europe. Along with air defense, subordinate units engaged in combat in support of ground forces during the breakthrough at St. Lo in July 1944. Attacked tanks, trucks, and troop concentrations as enemy retreated; provided armed reconnaissance for advancing Allied armored columns. During September 1944, attacked flak positions near Eindhoven during Operation Market-Garden, the airborne landing in the Netherlands; bombed enemy communications and transportation lines in western Germany. Flew armed reconnaissance missions over Battle of the Bulge during December 1944 – January 1944. Flew missions against enemy transportation systems including motor vehicles, bridges, trains, railway bridges, and marshalling yards during February and March 1945. Moved to Germany in April 1945, flying last combat missions on 3 May 1945.

However, inactivation only occurred on 25 June 1946, and the unit was disbanded on 8 October 1948.

Lineage
 Constituted as the IX Air Defense Command on 19 June 1944
 Activated on 1 July 1944
 Inactivated on 25 July 1946
 Disbanded on 8 October 1948

Assignments
 Ninth Air Force, 1 July 1944
 Unknown, 28 November 1945
 United States Air Forces in Europe, 2 December 1945
 Unknown, 1 February 1946 – 25 June 1946

Stations

 Borough of Hampstead, London (AAF-405), England, 1 July 1944
 Ecrammeville, France, July 1944
 Rennes Airfield (A-27), France, 25 August 1944

 Versailles, France, 8 September 1944
 Paris, France, 16 December 1944
 Bad Neustadt an der Saale, Germany, 24 May 1945 – 25 June 1946

Components
 Wing
 71st Fighter Wing, 1 July 1944 – November 1945

 Squadrons and companies
 422d Night Fighter Squadron, 6 August – 7 October 1944
 425th Night Fighter Squadron, 10–20 June 1944; 6 August – 7 October 1944
 368th Ordnance Maintenance (AA) Company, 1945

References

Notes
 Explanatory notes

 Citations

Bibliography

 
 
 
 

 Further reading
 

Military units and formations established in 1944
09
Air defence commands of the United States Army
Military units and formations disestablished in 1946